The New Museum of Contemporary Art, founded in 1977 by Marcia Tucker, is a museum in New York City at 235 Bowery, on Manhattan's Lower East Side.

History
The museum originally opened in a space in the Graduate Center of the then-named New School for Social Research at 65 Fifth Avenue. The New Museum remained there until 1983, when it rented and moved to the first two and a half floors of the Astor Building at 583 Broadway in the SoHo neighborhood.

In 1999, Marcia Tucker was succeeded as director by Lisa Phillips, previously the curator of contemporary art at the Whitney Museum of American Art. In 2001 the museum rented 7,000 square feet of space on the first floor of the Chelsea Art Museum on West 22nd Street for a year.

Over the past five years, the New Museum has exhibited artists from Argentina, Brazil, Bulgaria, Cameroon, China, Chile, Colombia, Cuba, Germany, India, Poland, Spain, South Africa, Turkey, and the United Kingdom among many other countries. In 2003, the New Museum formed an affiliation with Rhizome, a leading online platform for global new media art.

In 2005, the museum was among 406 New York City arts and social service institutions to receive part of a $20 million grant from the Carnegie Corporation, which was made possible through a donation by New York City mayor Michael Bloomberg.

Core value
The New Museum was established by an independent curator Marcia Tucker in 1977. It is dedicated to introducing new art and new ideas, by artists who have not yet received significant exposure or recognition. Ever since it was founded, the museum has taken on the mission to challenge the stiff institutionalization of an art museum. It continues to bring new ideas into the art world and to connect with the public.

New location (2007 to present) 
On December 1, 2007, the New Museum opened the doors to its new $50 million location at 235 Bowery, between Stanton and Rivington Streets.  The seven-story 58,700-square-foot facility, designed by the Tokyo-based firm Sejima + Nishizawa/SANAA and the New York-based firm Gensler, has greatly expanded the museum's exhibitions and space.

SANAA's design is chosen because it is in accord with the museum's mission—the flexibility of the building, its changeable atmosphere corresponds to the ever-changing nature of contemporary art. Its bold decision to put a stack of white boxes in the Bowery neighborhood and its success to achieve a harmonious symbiotic relationship between the two manifest the coexistence of different dynamic energy of contemporary culture.

In April 2008, the museum's new building was named one of the architectural New Seven Wonders of the World by Conde Nast Traveler. The New Museum has been and will continue to be a crucial landmark of the Bowery district. “Bowery embraces idiosyncrasy in an unprejudiced manner and we were determined to make the museum building feel like that”, as one of the directors of the museum puts it. The neighborhood appears to be a fearless confrontation with the convention image of downtown Manhattan—an adventurous spirit that the New Museum always sees itself searching for.

The Bowery location has gallery and events space, plus a Resource Center with books and computers for access to their main web site and digital archive. The New Museum Digital Archive is an online resource that provides accessibility to primary sources from exhibitions, publications, and programs. The archive holds 7,500 written and visual materials for artists and researchers to access. The New Museum Digital Archive's database is searchable through 4,000 artists, curators, and organizations connected to New Museum exhibitions, performances, and publications.

Unionization 
On January 24, 2019, eligible employees at the New Museum voted 38–8 to unionize, with a plan to join NewMuU-UAW Local 2110. Asked for their reasons for unionizing, the New Museum employees said, “As the New Museum Union, we ask, above all, that these ideals be mirrored in the museum’s working conditions, hiring practices, wages, and benefits. We believe that fair compensation and transparency for all workers throughout the museum is essential to ensuring its diversity, reducing turnover, and strengthening the New Museum community: salaries, wages, and benefits at the museum must be sustainable for everyone, regardless of the privileges afforded them by race, class, or gender.”

Collection
When she founded the museum, Marcia Tucker decided it should buy and sell works every 10 years so that the collection would always be new. It was an innovative plan that was never carried out. In 2000, the museum accepted its first corporate donation of artworks. The museum then held a modest collection of about 1,000 works in many media. In 2004, it joined forces with the Museum of Contemporary Art, Chicago and the Hammer Museum in Los Angeles in raising $110,000 from two foundations -- $50,000 from the American Center Foundation and $60,000 from the Peter Norton Family Foundation—to help pay for commissioning, buying, and exhibiting the work of emerging young artists. As of 2021, the New Museum has been a non-collecting institution.

Exhibitions and the Triennial

The museum presents the work of under-recognized artists, and has mounted ambitious surveys of important figures such as Ana Mendieta, William Kentridge, David Wojnarowicz, Paul McCarthy and Andrea Zittel before they received widespread public recognition. In 2003, the New Museum presented the highly regarded exhibition Black President: The Art and Legacy of Fela Anikulapo-Kuti.

Continuing its focus of exhibiting emerging international artists, the museum organized the much discussed and visited exhibition, The Generational: "Younger Than Jesus" curated by Massimiliano Gioni, in 2009 which went on the become the first edition of its  now signature exhibition series the "New Museum Triennial".  Subsequently, the museum held the second and third editions of its Triennial, respectively; "The Ungovernables" (2012 – curated by Eungie Joo) and the much lauded "Surround Audience" (2015 – curated by Lauren Cornell and Ryan Trecartin).

Promoted twice since joining the New Museum in 2011, Margot Norton has organized exhibitions including one by Turner Prize-winner Laure Prouvost and the museum solo of Judith Bernstein.

The museum has announced a summer show, scheduled to open on July 20, 2016, called "The Keeper".  With over 4,000 objects from more than two dozen collectors, it presents object lessons about the process of collecting.

Past exhibitions
Hans Haacke: All Connected (October 24, 2019 to January 26, 2020) 
 Marianna Simnett: Blood In My Milk (April 9, 2018 to June 1, 2019)
 Petrit Halilaj: RU (September 27, 2017 to January 7, 2018)
Raymond Pettibon: A Pen of All Work (??? to April 9, 2017)
 Pipilotti Rist: Pixel Forest (October 26, 2016 to January 15, 2017)
 My Barbarian: The Audience is Always Right (September 28, 2016 to January 8, 2017)
 Surround Audience triennial (February 25, 2015 to May 24, 2015)
 Niv Acosta: Discotropic (February 25, 2015 to May 24, 2015)
 Night and Day: Chris Ofili (October 29, 2014 to February 1, 2015)
 Christen Clifford: Wolf Woman performance (2014)
 Lili Reynaud-Dewar: LIVE THROUGH THAT?! (October 15, 2014 to January 25, 2015)
 Here and Elsewhere (July 16, 2014 to September 28, 2014)
 Pawel Althamer: The Neighbors (February 12, 2014 to April 13, 2014)
 Laure Prouvost: For Forgetting (February 12, 2014 to April 13, 2014)
 Report on the Construction of a Spaceship Module (January 22, 2014 to April 13, 2014)
 Occupied Territory: A New Museum Trilogy (January 22, 2014 to April 13, 2014)
 Chris Burden: Extreme Measures (October 2, 2013 to January 12, 2014)
 Ghosts in the Machine (July 18, 2012 to September 30, 2012)
 The Ungovernables triennial (February 15, 2012 to April 22, 2012)
 Carsten Höller: Experience (October 26, 2011 to January 22, 2012)
 Ostalgia (July 7, 2011 to September 2, 2011)
 Rivane Neuenschwander: A Day Like Any Other (June 23, 2010 to September 19, 2010)
 Younger than Jesus triennial (April 8, 2009 to July 12, 2009)
 Live Forever: Elizabeth Peyton (October 8, 2008 to January 11, 2009)
 Unmonumental: The Object in the 21st Century (December 1, 2007 to March 30, 2008)

Other programs
Rhizome, a not-for-profit arts organization that supports and provides a platform for new media art, has been an affiliate organization of New Museum since 2003. Today, Rhizome's programs include events, exhibitions at the New Museum and elsewhere, an active website, and an archive of more than 2,000 new media artworks.

In 2008, art dealer Barbara Gladstone initiated the formation of the Stuart Regen Visionaries Fund at the New Museum, established in honor of her late son and renowned art dealer. The gift supported a new series of public lectures and presentations by cultural visionaries, the Visionaries Series, which debuted in 2009 and features prominent international thinkers in the fields of art, architecture, design and contemporary culture. In 2020 the series shifted to focus on first-ever public conversations between leading figures, with Claudia Rankine and Judith Butler (2020) and Jeremy O Harris and Arthur Jafa (2021). Previous speakers included author Rachel Kushner (2018, in conversation with novelist Ben Lerner); explorer Erling Kagge (2017); essayist and critic Fran Lebowitz (2016, in conversation with filmmaker Martin Scorsese); critic and author Hilton Als (2015); director, screenwriter, and producer Darren Aronofsky (2014, in conversation with novelist and critic Lynne Tillman); writer, director, and producer Matthew Weiner (2013, in conversation with writer A.M. Homes); artist and architect Maya Lin (2012); chef, author, and activist Alice Waters (2011); founder of Wikipedia Jimmy Wales (2010); and choreographer Bill T. Jones (2009), whose talk inaugurated this program.

NEW INC, the first museum-led incubator, is a shared workspace and professional development program designed to support creative practitioners working in the areas of art, technology, and design. Conceived by the New Museum in 2013, the incubator is a not-for-profit platform that furthers the museum's ongoing commitment to new art and new ideas. Launched in summer 2014, NEW INC provided a collaborative space for an interdisciplinary community of one hundred members to investigate new ideas and develop a sustainable practice. NEW INC full-time members include Erica Gorochow, Anders Sandell, Lisa Park, Kevin Siwoff, Kunal Gupta, Justin Cone, Jonathan Harris, Joe Doucet, Greg Hochmuth, Luisa Pereira, Nitzan Hermon, Tristan Perich, Sougwen Chung, Philip Sierzega, Paul Soulellis, Charlie Whitney, Binta Ayofemi, and Emilie Baltz.

In 2021, the New Museum launched the biennial Hostetler/Wrigley Sculpture Award to commission five women artists to create sculptures. Each winning project is allotted $400,000 for its production and installation.

IdeasCity was a nine-year New Museum platform to explore art and culture beyond the walls of the museum. Founded in 2011 by Lisa Phillips and Karen Wong, IdeasCity was a collaborative initiative between hundreds of arts, design, education, and community organizations that consists of two distinct components: the biennial IdeasCity Festival in New York City, and IdeasCity Global Programs in key urban centers around the world, including Athens, Detroit, Istanbul, New Orleans, São Paulo, Shanghai, and Toronto. IdeasCity curators included Richard Flood, Joseph Grima, V. Mitch McEwen, and Vere Van Gool. The IdeasCity program concluded in 2020.

Management

Funding
In 2002, the New Museum sold its previous home in SoHo for $18 million. It subsequently bought the new Bowery site for $5 million. In order to cover the building and endowment, it raised an estimated $64 million.

Board of Trustees
Since taking office, director Lisa Phillips expanded board membership to 42 from 18. As of 2015, it includes collectors Maja Hoffmann, Dakis Joannou, and Eugenio López Alonso, among others.

See also
 List of museums and cultural institutions in New York City

References

External links

 Bowery Artist Tribute
 New Museum Union
IdeasCity
The New Museum of Contemporary Art: a case study on Constructalia

1977 establishments in New York City
Art museums established in 1977
Art museums and galleries in New York City
Contemporary art galleries in the United States
Museums in Manhattan
SANAA buildings
Bowery